Kingsley Musabula (born 26 December 1973) is a Zambian footballer. He played in 12 matches for the Zambia national football team from 1994 to 2000. He was also named in Zambia's squad for the 1994 African Cup of Nations tournament.

References

1973 births
Living people
Zambian footballers
Zambia international footballers
1994 African Cup of Nations players
Place of birth missing (living people)
Association footballers not categorized by position